Panik i familien is a 1945 Danish film directed by Lau Lauritzen Jr. and Alice O'Fredericks. Nordisk Film released the film on DVD in October 2016.

Cast
Ib Schønberg as Larsen
Christian Arhoff as Hansen
Lily Broberg as Fru Hansen
Jessie Rindom as Fru Larsen
Svend Bille
Henry Nielsen
Astrid Neumann
Birthe Korsø
Poul Guldager
Bjørn Puggaard-Müller

References

External links

Danish black-and-white films
Films directed by Lau Lauritzen Jr.
Films directed by Alice O'Fredericks
Films scored by Sven Gyldmark
Danish musical comedy films
1945 musical comedy films
1940s Danish-language films